Abacetus artus is a species of ground beetle in the subfamily Pterostichinae. It was described by Andrewes in 1942 and is an endemic species found in India.

References

artus
Beetles described in 1942
Insects of India